A Melbourne Mystery is a 1913 Australian silent film starring John Gavin.

It is considered a lost film.

Cast
John Gavin
Agnes Gavin

Production
A. Sculthorpe, who worked on the movie, remembers the film as being "a little starved because of the promoters lack of finance" but said it "compared favourably with the Importations of the time." He also recalled shooting a sequence involving a brawl in Swanston Street which resulted in police trying to arrest the actors.

Reception
According to Sculthorpe "it was a good picture but the exhibitors gave us little encouragement."

References

External links

1913 films
Australian black-and-white films
Australian silent feature films
Lost Australian films